This is a comparison of operating systems in regard to their support of the IPv6 protocol.

Notes
Operating systems that support neither DHCPv6 nor SLAAC cannot automatically configure unicast IPv6 addresses.
Operating systems that support neither DHCPv6 nor ND RDNSS cannot automatically configure name servers in an IPv6-only environment.

References

External links
ISOC IPv6 FAQ with OS tips

IPv6
Computing comparisons
IPv6 support